"The Girl Who Was Death" is an episode of the allegorical British science fiction TV series, The Prisoner. It was written by Terence Feely and directed by David Tomblin and was the sixteenth produced. It was broadcast in the UK on ITV (Scottish Television) on Thursday 18 January 1968 (and a day later on ATV Midlands and Grampian) and aired in the United States on CBS on 7 September 1968.

The episode starred Patrick McGoohan as Number Six and Kenneth Griffith in the first of two episodes he appeared in. According to several sources, including The Prisoner by Robert Fairclough, this episode was adapted from an unused, two-part script originally commissioned for Danger Man.

Plot summary
A cricket match ends in a player (Colonel Hawke-Englishe) being assassinated with a bomb disguised as a cricket ball. Number Six is on an operational assignment, but it is unclear whether this is "real time", pre-The Village, or possibly another induced hallucination.

Secret messages are passed to him at a shoeshine box. In a record shop, he receives an assignment to find a Professor Schnipps who has been working on a rocket that will destroy all of London. It turns out that Colonel Hawke-Englishe was investigating the matter, which is why he was assassinated. He picks up where Colonel Hawke-Englishe left off in another match, but manages to avoid the same fate. He finds a note to meet a mysterious person at the local pub; while there, he drinks from a glass that says You have just been poisoned. He then starts to drink numerous spirits to try and vomit out the poison.

When he goes to the restroom, he gets another message to meet at the Turkish bath. While he is relaxing, a mysterious figure places a plastic dome over his head and locks his stall. Avoiding death, he now gets another message to go to the carnival, to the local fight. Number Six dresses up in a Sherlock Holmes costume with deerstalker hat and cape, with moustache and mutton chop sideburns. 
At the fight, he is picked for the next match and told by his opponent to go to the tunnel of love. He then hears the voice of a woman, which is a recording in his boat that is rigged with explosives. He tracks down, and is tracked by, a seductive woman called Sonia, alias "Death". She leaves the amusement park with Number Six in pursuit.

They come to an abandoned village, where Sonia has set traps. He successfully evades all of them, goes into a shed to avoid being shot, and rides a bulldozer. Sonia destroys it with a rocket launcher and departs.

Eventually, after faking his death, Number Six tracks Sonia to a lighthouse where Schnipps (dressed as Napoleon) and his associates are based. His lieutenants are dressed in Grande Armée uniforms and represent an apparently anti-London alliance composed of Scottish, Welsh, Irish, and Northern (particularly Yorkshire) marshals.

Number Six sabotages their firearms and hand grenades, rigging them to backfire or malfunction. Captured, Number Six is tied up and left inside the lighthouse, which is revealed to be the rocket. As it is about to launch, he escapes and the rocket blows up without launching, killing his adversaries.

In the end, it turns out that the adventure was nothing but a bedtime story, which Number Six was telling to some children in the Village nursery. Number Two (who looks like Schnipps) and his assistant (who looks like Sonia) were hoping that he would drop his guard and allow some clue as to why he resigned.

But Number Six, after putting the children to bed, turns to the hidden camera and cheekily wishes: "Good night, children... everywhere."

Additional guest cast
 Kenneth Griffith . . . Schnipps/Number Two
 Justine Lord . . . Sonia/Assistant
 Christopher Benjamin . . . Potter
 Michael Brennan . . . Killer Karminski
 Harold Berens . . . Boxing M.C.
 Sheena Marshe . . . Barmaid
 Max Faulkner . . . Scots Napoleon
 John Rees . . . Welsh Napoleon
 Joe Gladwin . . . Yorkshire Napoleon
 John Drake . . . Bowler
 Gaynor Steward . . . Little Girl
 Graham Steward . . . First Little Boy
 Stephen Howe . . . Second Little Boy
 Alexis Kanner (uncredited) . . . Photographer

Locations
The cricket match shown at the start of the episode was filmed at four different locations with the main sequences shot at Eltisley in Cambridgeshire, and stock footage at Meopham Green, Meopham, Kent on the A227 Gravesend to Tonbridge Road.

The lighthouse is Beachy Head Lighthouse.  The fairground scenes were filmed in the former Kursaal Funfair in Southend-on-Sea, some of which appear in the episode as back projections.

Production notes
When Sonia traps Number Six in a hot box in the Turkish baths, she does so by sliding a broom shaft through the handles of the doors. This technique was used on James Bond in Thunderball two years before.

The episode features an actor named John Drake in a small role as a bowler in the two cricket matches featured in the early scenes; John Drake was the name of Patrick McGoohan's previous TV alter ego in the series Danger Man, which reworked material from scripts not used in the previous series.

Broadcast
The broadcast date of the episode varied in different ITV regions of the UK. This was the first episode that was not shown first on ATV Midlands and Grampian Television (who picked up ATV Midlands' broadcasts), since they had been forced to delay their broadcasts to accommodate the fact that the series finale "Fall Out" would be ready for screening on Friday 19 January as planned. As a result, ATV Midlands took a two-week hiatus from broadcasting The Prisoner after airing "Living in Harmony" on 29 December 1967. The final two colour episodes of Danger Man (its abbreviated fourth season) that had originally been planned to air after "Fall Out" were brought forward and screened on ATV Midlands and Grampian on Friday 5 and 12 January 1968. Anglia Television, which had been broadcasting The Prisoner on Saturdays, one week behind ATV Midlands, also took a two week hiatus after broadcasting Living in Harmony on 6 January.

This delay meant that ATV Midlands and Grampian were no longer leading the series' broadcasts; the episode was first shown on Scottish Television Thursday 18 January 1968, on Friday 19 January on ATV Midlands and Grampian Television, on Sunday 21 January on ATV London, whose broadcasts were also taken up by Southern Television, Westward Television and Tyne-Tees; on Friday 26 January on Border Television on Saturday 27 January on Anglia Television and on Friday 16 February on Granada Television in the North West, which had also taken a two week hiatus from broadcasting The Prisoner. The aggregate viewing figures for the ITV regions that debuted the season in 1967 have been estimated at 8.9 million. In Northern Ireland, the episode did not debut until Saturday 6 April 1968, and in Wales, the episode was not broadcast until Wednesday 8 April 1970.

References

Sources
  – script of episode

External links
 

The Prisoner episodes
1968 British television episodes

fr:La Mort en marche (Le Prisonnier)